Rubén Blades Bellido de Luna (born July 16, 1948), known professionally as Rubén Blades (but  in Panama and within the family), is a Panamanian musician, singer, composer, actor, activist, and politician, performing musically most often in the salsa, and Latin jazz genres. As a songwriter, Blades brought the lyrical sophistication of Central American nueva canción and Cuban nueva trova as well as experimental tempos and politically inspired Son Cubano salsa to his music, creating "thinking persons' (salsa) dance music". Blades has written dozens of hit songs, including "Pedro Navaja" and "El Cantante" (which became Héctor Lavoe's signature song). He has won eleven Grammy Awards out of seventeen nominations and twelve Latin Grammy Awards.

His acting career began in 1983, and has continued, sometimes with several-year breaks to focus on other projects. He has prominent roles in films such as Crossover Dreams (1985), The Milagro Beanfield War (1988), The Super (1991), Predator 2 (1990), Color of Night (1994), Safe House (2012), The Counselor (2013) and Hands of Stone (2016), along with three Emmy Award nominations for his performances in The Josephine Baker Story (1991), Crazy from the Heart (1992) and The Maldonado Miracle (2003). He portrayed Daniel Salazar, a main character on the TV series Fear the Walking Dead (2015–2017; 2019–present).

He is an icon in Panama and is much admired throughout Latin America and Spain, and managed to attract 17% of the vote in his failed attempt to win the Panamanian presidency in 1994. In September 2004, he was appointed minister of tourism by Panamanian president Martín Torrijos for a five-year term. He holds a ' Law degree from the University of Panama and an LL.M in International Law from Harvard University. He is married to singer Luba Mason.

He made his debut with the Pete Rodriguez orchestra in 1970 on his album De Panamá a New York and among his most successful albums are Rubén Blades y Son del Solar... Live!, Amor y Control, Caminando, SALSWING!, Son de Panamá, Tangos , Canciones del Solar de los Aburridos, Buscando América, El Que la Hace la Paga, Escenas, Salsa Big Band, Metiendo Mano! and his famous album Siembra released in 1978. In addition, he has collaborated with different artists such as Usher, Elvis Costello, as a soloist and as a guest Michael Jackson, Luis Miguel, Julio Iglesias, Ricky Martin, Juan Gabriel, Laura Pausini, Shakira, Thalía in the Spanish version of the song "What More Can I Give" written and translated by Blades as "Todo Para Ti". He has also participated in several productions by different Latino artists such as "Almost Like Praying", "Color Esperanza 2020", "Hoy Es Domingo" among other tracks. He also translated into Spanish the track "I Just Can't Stop Loving You" in the version called "Todo Mi Amor eres Tu" included in Jackson's anniversary album Bad 25.

Family history and early life
Blades was born in Panama City, Panama. He is the son of Cuban musician and actress Anoland Díaz (real surname Bellido de Luna), and Colombian Rubén Darío Blades Sr., an athlete, percussionist and graduate of the Federal Bureau of Narcotics in Washington, D.C. His mother's great-uncle, Juan Bellido de Luna, was active in the Cuban revolutionary movement against Spain and was a writer and publisher in New York City. Blades's paternal grandfather, Rubén Blades, was an English-speaking native of St. Lucia who came to Panama as an accountant. His family is uncertain how the Blades family ended up in St. Lucia, but when his grandfather moved to Panama, he lived in the Panamanian Bocas del Toro Province. Blades thought that his grandfather had come to Panama to work on the Panama Canal, as he tells in the song "West Indian Man" on the album Amor y Control ("That's where the Blades comes from") (1992). He explains the source and the pronunciation of his family surname, which is of English origin, in his web show Show De Ruben Blades (SDRB).

In Blades's early days, he was a vocalist in Los Salvajes del Ritmo, and also a songwriter and guest singer with a professional Latin music conjunto (ensemble), Bush y sus Magníficos. His strongest influence of the day was the Joe Cuba sextet and Cheo Feliciano, whose singing style he copied to the point of imitating his voice tone and vocal range.

Career

1970s–1980s
Blades earned multiple degrees in political science and law at the Universidad Nacional de Panamá and performed legal work at the Bank of Panama as a law student. After graduating in 1974, he moved to the U.S. and stayed with his exiled parents in Miami, Florida, before moving to New York City. Andy Harlow said that "he used to sleep on my couch while he worked at Fania (Records); used to say "I write songs, too."

His first recording in the United States of America was the solo album, De Panamá a New York, with the Pete Rodriguez Orchestra, which included original compositions such as "Juan Gonzalez", "Descarga Caliente" and "De Panamá a New York", which were recorded in New York City by Alegre Records in 1970. He then returned to Panamá and finished his degree.

Blades began his career in New York City writing songs while working in the mailroom at Fania Records. Soon Blades was working with salseros Ray Barretto and Larry Harlow. Shortly thereafter, Blades started collaborating with trombonist and bandleader Willie Colón. They recorded several albums together and participated in albums by plena singer Mon Rivera and the Fania All Stars.

Blades's first notable hit was a song on the 1977 album Metiendo Mano that he had composed in 1968: "Pablo Pueblo", a meditation about a working-class father who returns to his home after a long day at work. The song later became his unofficial campaign song when he ran for president of Panama. The Colón and Blades recording on the same album of Tite Curet Alonso's composition, "Plantación Adentro", which dealt with the brutal treatment of Indian natives in Latin America's colonial times, was a hit in various Caribbean countries. He wrote and performed several songs with the Fania All Stars and as a guest on other artists' releases, including the hits "Paula C", written about a girlfriend at the time; "Juan Pachanga", about a party animal who buries his pain for a lost love in dance and drink; and "Sin Tu Cariño", a love song, featuring a bomba break. The latter two songs feature piano solos by the Puerto Rican pianist Papo Lucca.

In 1978, Blades wrote the song "El Cantante"; Colón convinced him to give the song to Colón's former musical partner, Héctor Lavoe, to record, since Lavoe's nickname was already "El Cantante de los Cantantes" ("the singer of singers"). Lavoe recorded it that same year, and it became both a big hit and Lavoe's signature song; a biographical film, El Cantante about Lavoe took the same title. (The film El Cantante, starring executive producer Marc Anthony and then wife Jennifer López, told a fictionalized version of this story, in which Blades tells Lavoe he wrote the song for him.)

The Colón and Blades album Siembra (1978) became the best-selling salsa record in history. It has sold over 3 million copies, and almost all of its songs were hits at one time or another in various Latin American countries. Its most famous song was "Pedro Navaja", a song inspired by the 1928 song "Mack the Knife"; it tells the story of a neighborhood thug who is killed by a street walker who knows him (he stabs her, she shoots him, they both die, a bum finds them, and takes his belongings). The song inspired a 1980 Puerto Rican musical, La verdadera historia de Pedro Navaja, and a 1984 Mexican film, Pedro Navaja, neither of which had Blades' involvement. Blades wrote and sang a sequel song, "Sorpresas", (surprises) on his 1985 album, Escenas, which revealed that Pedro had survived the incident and was still alive.

Blades became dissatisfied with Fania and tried to terminate his contract, but was legally obliged to record several more albums. Maestra Vida and its follow-up Canciones del Solar de los Aburridos are highlights.

In 1982, Blades got his first acting role, in The Last Fight, portraying a singer-turned-boxer vying for a championship against a fighter who was played by real-life world-champion boxer Salvador Sánchez. In 1984, he released Buscando América, and in 1985, Blades gained widespread recognition as co-writer and star of the independent film Crossover Dreams as a New York salsa singer willing to do anything to break into the mainstream. Blades also began his career in films scoring music for soundtracks. Also in 1985, he earned a master's degree in international law from Harvard Law School. He was the subject of Robert Mugge's documentary The Return of Rubén Blades, which debuted at that year's Denver Film Festival. He also recorded a segment for the 60 Minutes television program, interviewed by Morley Safer.

In 1984, Blades left Fania, and signed with Elektra, although Fania continued to release recordings compiled from their archives for some years afterwards. Blades assembled a top-notch band (known variously as Seis del Solar or Son del Solar) and began touring and recording with them. His first album with them, Escenas, included a duet with Linda Ronstadt (1985), won Blades his first Grammy Award, for Best Tropical Latin Album. He then recorded the album Agua de Luna, based on the short stories of writer Gabriel García Márquez, in 1987. The next year he released the English-language collaboration Nothing But the Truth, with rock artists Sting, Elvis Costello, and Lou Reed whose song "The Hit" aka its main chorus "Don't Double Cross the Ones You Love", appeared in the opening and closing credits of Sidney Lumet's 1990 crime drama film Q & A; also in 1988 he released the more traditionally salsa Antecedente, again with Seis del Solar, which again won a Grammy Award.

1990s–2000s
During the 1990s, he acted in films and continued to make records with Seis/Son del Solar. In 1990, he released the collection Poetry: the Greatest Hits that according to Q Magazine highlighted his political commentary and pastiche approach to music. 

In 1994, he mounted his unsuccessful Panamanian presidential bid, founding the party, Movimiento Papa Egoró. The album that followed this experience was titled, La Rosa de los Vientos. He also made the award-winning music such as Pena and Amor y Control, won the 1997 Grammy for Best Tropical Latin Performance, and all its songs were by Panamanian songwriters, recorded using all Panamanian musicians. In 1996, Blades along with Son Miserables performed "No Te Miento (I Am Not Lying [to you])" for the AIDS benefit album Silencio=Muerte: Red Hot + Latin produced by the Red Hot Organization. In 1997, Blades headed the cast of singer/songwriter Paul Simon's first Broadway musical, The Capeman, based on a true story about a violent youth who becomes a poet in prison, which also starred Marc Anthony and Ednita Nazario. His many film appearances include The Milagro Beanfield War (1988), The Two Jakes (1990), Predator 2 (1990), Mo' Better Blues (1990), Color of Night (1994), and Devil's Own (1997). He also guest-starred in an amusing episode of The X Files titled, "El Mundo Gira" ("As The World Turns"). He played immigration agent (la migra), Conrad Lozano, who works with Mulder and Scully to solve unexplained murders involving both rural California migrant workers and the Mexican folklore of El Chupacabra. In 1999, he played Mexican artist Diego Rivera in Tim Robbins' Cradle Will Rock. In the 2003 film Once Upon a Time in Mexico, starring Johnny Depp, Antonio Banderas, and Willem Dafoe, he played the role of a retired FBI agent.

Blades's 1999 album Tiempos, which he recorded with musicians from the Costa Rican groups Editus and Sexteto de Jazz Latino, represented a break from his salsa past and a further rejection of commercial trends in Latin music. Ironically, the album won a Grammy Award for Best Latin Pop Album. Blades was inducted into the International Latin Music Hall of Fame in 2001. Even more eclectic was the 2002 album Mundo with the 11-member Editus Ensemble and bagpiper Eric Rigler, which incorporated instruments from around the world. Mundo won the Grammy Award for Best World Music Album, and was also nominated for a Latin Grammy Award for Album of the Year. The same year, Blades guested on world music artist Derek Trucks' album, Joyful Noise. In 2003 he followed Mundo with a web site free-download project. Blades was presented with the Founders Award at the 2005 ASCAP Latin Awards. In 2004, he put his artistic career on hold when he began serving a five-year appointment as Panama's minister of tourism. Beginning in June 2007, however, Blades turned some of his attention back to his artistic career, presenting an online TV show titled Show de Ruben Blades (SDRB) on his website.

In November 2005 he received an honorary degree from the Berklee College of Music.

In May 2007, Blades was sued by his former bandmate, Willie Colón for breach of contract. This led to a series of suits and countersuits that lasted over five years. A book titled Decisiones detailing the inside story of this legal battle was written by Blades' former agent, Robert J. Morgalo and published in 2016 in English and Spanish.

In the middle of 2008 he took a leave of absence for a mini-tour in Europe, backed by the Costa Rican band Son de Tikizia. When his government service was completed in June 2009, he reunited the members of Seis del Solar for the 25th anniversary of Buscando América in an ambitious tour of the Americas.

2010–present

In June 2011, Blades was given the Harry Chapin Humanitarian Award by ASCAP and WhyHunger.

In 2014, Blades was the closing act for the Festival Internacional Cervantino in Mexico.

In 2015, Blades' album Tangos won a Grammy award for Best Latin Pop Album.

Blades expressed his interest in making another run for president of Panama in 2019.

In 2015, Blades was cast in the regular role of Daniel Salazar in the AMC post-apocalyptic drama Fear the Walking Dead, a companion series to The Walking Dead. Blades first appears in the second episode "So Close, Yet So Far".

In 2017, Blades performed as one of the featured artists for Puerto Rico in Lin-Manuel Miranda's charity single "Almost Like Praying" to raise money for victims of Hurricane Maria.

In September 2018, Blades was appointed as NYU Steinhardt Dean's Inaugural Scholar-in-Residence at New York University.

In 2021, Blades was honored as the Latin Recording Academy Person of the Year for his contributions to Latin music and activism.

Filmography

Discography

Studio albums 
 De Panamá a New York (1970)
 The Good, the Bad, the Ugly (with Willie Colón) (1975)
 Metiendo Mano! (1977)
 Siembra (1978)
 Bohemio y Poeta (1979)
 Maestra Vida: Primera Parte (1980)
 Maestra Vida: Segunda Parte (1980)
 Canciones Del Solar De Los Aburridos (1981)
 The Last Fight (1982)
 El Que la Hace la Paga (1982)
 Mucho Mejor (1984)
 Buscando América (1984)
 Escenas (1985)
 Doble Filo (1986) 
 Crossover Dreams (1986)
 Agua de Luna (1986)
 With Strings (1988)
 Antecedente (1988)
 Nothing But the Truth (1988)
 Caminando (1991)
 Amor y Control (1992)
 Joseph & His Brothers (1993)
 Tras La Tormenta (with Willie Colón) (1995)
 La Rosa de los Vientos (1996)
 Tiempos (1999)
 Mundo (2002)
 Cantares del Subdesarrollo (2009) 
 Eba Say Ajá (with Cheo Feliciano) (2012)
 Tangos (2014)
 Son de Panamá (2015) 
 Almost Like Praying (2017)
 Salsa Big Band (2017)
 Medoro Madera (2018)
 Paraíso Road Gang (2019)
 SALSWING! (2021)
 Pasieros (2022)

EPs 

SALSA PLUS! (2021)
SWING! (2021)
 Parceiros (2022)

Live albums 

Siembra Live (1980)
Doble Filo (1986)
Rubén Blades y Son del Solar... Live! (1990)
Todos Vuelven: Live, Vol. 1 (2011)
Todos Vuelven: Live, Vol. 2 (2011)
Una Noche con Rubén Blades (2018)

Compilation albums 

Poeta Latino (1993)
Poety: The Gratest Hits (1994)
La Leyenda (1994)
The Best (1996)
Gratest Hits (Música Latina) (1996)
Sus Más Grandes Éxitos (1998)
Best of Rubén Blades (1998)
Salsa Caliente de New York (2002)
Una Década (2003)
La Experiencia (2004)
A Man And His Music: Poeta del Pueblo (2008)
Greatest Hits (2008)
Dos Clásicos (2011)
10 de Colección (2014)
Serie Platino (2014)
Salsero Original (2016)

Awards and nominations

Grammy Awards

Latin Grammy Awards

Note: At the 4th Annual Latin Grammy Awards, Mundo also received a nomination for Best Engineered Album, which went to engineers Walter Flores, Oscar Marín, Daniela Pastore and Edín Solís.

References

External links

  
 

1948 births
20th-century Panamanian male singers
20th-century Panamanian singers
21st-century Panamanian male singers
21st-century Panamanian singers
Afro-Cuban jazz bandleaders
Afro-Cuban jazz singers
Elektra Records artists
Fania Records artists
Grammy Award winners
Harvard Law School alumni
Latin Grammy Award winners
Latin jazz musicians
Latin music songwriters
Living people
Maracas players
20th-century Panamanian lawyers
Panamanian male actors
Panamanian people of Colombian descent
Panamanian people of Cuban descent
Panamanian people of English descent
Panamanian songwriters
Salsa musicians
Male jazz musicians
University of Panama alumni
Tourism ministers of Panama